Dumfries High School is situated in a residential area of Marchmount in Dumfries, Scotland. It has been on this site since 1961, and has been expanded and improved since. It is adjacent to the David Keswick Athletic Centre, which provides sporting facilities both for the school and the local community. It is one of Dumfries' 4 high schools. 

The headteacher of Dumfries High School is Philip Cubbon.

Notable former pupils
 Billy Houliston, international footballer
 William Wilson (goalkeeper)
 Calvin Harris, pop artist.

References

External links
Dumfries High School
Dumfries and Galloway Council, School Services; Dumfries High School information page
Dumfries High School's page on Scottish Schools Online

Secondary schools in Dumfries and Galloway
Dumfries